Toheart (commonly stylized as ToHeart) is a South Korean duo formed by Woohyun from Infinite and Key from Shinee in 2014. It is a collaboration between SM Entertainment and Woollim Entertainment.

History

On February 20, 2014 S.M. Entertainment released a teaser announcing Toheart, a special unit duo consisting of Woohyun of Infinite and Key of Shinee. The release was followed by a second prologue teaser which was released on February 27. After the release of a music video teaser on March 4, 2014 and a track preview video a few days later, Toheart debuted with the mini album Delicious and the music video for the title track was released on March 10. On the same day, the duo held their first showcase in the Coex Artium, hosted by bandmates Minho and Sungkyu. Jeff Benjamin from Billboard praised the duo's vocals, and also the choreography and on-screen charisma.

Both Woohyun and Key stated that it was their idea to create this unit, since both are friends and they had interest in working with each other. They didn't expect to do a singing collaboration project, instead thinking of photoshoots and similar. On April 7, 2014 the duo followed up their promotions with "Tell Me Why" featuring Infinite Sungyeol’s little brother, Lee Dae-yeol as well as actress Mun Ka-young. The song was requested most by fans and is produced by Sweetune. It tells the story about a man’s unwillingness to let a lover go.

Discography

Extended plays

Singles

Other charted songs

Music videos

Awards and nominations

SBS MTV Best of the Best 

|-
| 2014
| "Delicious"
| Best Male MV
|

Golden Disk Awards 

|-
| 2015
| Toheart 
| Popularity  Award
|

References

SM Entertainment artists
Woollim Entertainment artists
K-pop music groups
South Korean dance music groups
South Korean boy bands
South Korean musical duos
Musical groups from Seoul
Musical groups established in 2014
2014 establishments in South Korea